Jamie Shelton (born 1988) is a British actor, who plays Robbie Lawson in the show Emmerdale on ITV soap opera from 2012 to 2014.

References

External links
  Jamie Shelton IMDb

21st-century British male actors
Living people
1988 births
British male soap opera actors
Date of birth missing (living people)
Place of birth missing (living people)